Yingqian Station is a metro station of Line 6 of the Fuzhou Metro. It is located on the intersection of G316 and Yingzhou Road in Changle District, Fuzhou, Fujian, China. It is the first elevated metro station in Fuzhou Metro, also the first metro station in Changle District.

Station layout

Exits

References 

Fuzhou Metro stations